The Paikuli inscription (in ) is a bilingual Parthian and Middle Persian text corpus which was inscribed on the stone blocks of the walls of Paikuli tower; the latter is located in what is now southern part of Iraqi Kurdistan near modern-day Barkal village, Sulaymaniyah Governorate, Iraq. These inscribed stone blocks are now in the Sulaymaniyah Museum; the field only contains the stones that were used in the construction of the tower. It was set up as a monument to victory, and tells how and why the Sasanian emperor Narseh (also written Narses) ousted his grandnephew from power.

In 293 Narses marched from Armenia in open revolt against his nephew with a host of supporters and allies, whose names are recorded on the Paikuli inscription.

Background 
The Paikuli inscription of Narses shows that Asuristan (Babylonia) at least was in Persian hands, but says nothing of Nisibis and Singara.

The fact of Amr ibn Adi's vassalage to Narses was preserved by the latter in the Paikuli inscription.

In the 19th century, when it was visited by several travelers, it consisted of the ruins of a large, square tower that had originally been covered on all sides by stone blocks, some contained inscriptions, but, at the time, lay scattered all around the monument.

Sassanians 
In Tabari and sources that follow his work, and also in the Paikuli inscription of Narses, a son of Papak called Shapur is mentioned as his successor, although the text of the inscription of Paikuli in which king Shapur appears is unclear because of long lacunae. Some suggest that Narses in the inscription sought to compare his succession to the throne with that of his grandfather Ardashir, just as Ardashir had succeeded Shapur.

Gallery 
The Sulaymaniyah Museum in Iraqi Kurdistan opened a new Gallery on June 10, 2019, dedicated to the Paikuli Tower, its inscription, and King Narseh. The Sulaymaniyah Museum is the only Museum which displays relics of the Paikuli Tower.

References

Bibliography 
P.O. Skjærvø and H. Humbach, The Sassanian Inscription of Paikuli, Wiesbaden, 1983.

External links 
The Sassanian Inscription of Paikuli
The Sassanian Inscription of Paikuli by Prods Skjærvø
Herzfeld and the Paikuli Inscription at Encyclopaedia Iranica
The complete set of the inscribed Parthian and Middle Persian stone blocks of the Paikuli Tower at the Sulaymaniyah Museum, Iraq

Sasanian inscriptions
3rd-century inscriptions
Ancient Armenia
Middle Persian
Parthian language